El Durazno is a Chilean village located in Las Cabras commune, O'Higgins Region southeast of Graneros.

References

Populated places in Cachapoal Province